Doda is a town and a notified area committee in Doda district in the Indian union territory of  Jammu and Kashmir.

Climate
The climate of the area is not uniform due to wide variations in altitude from place to place. The area, in general, enjoys temperate to sub-tropical type of climate. The climate of the district is almost dry. The rainfall is scanty. The temperature of the district varies from place to place. Ramban and Doda tehsils are fairly warmer while the regions like Dessa Valley tehsil Bhagwah, Gundna, Padder, Marwah and Warwan remain snow bound for five-six months of the year. Summer is generally without rain and precipitation. Almost all the regions experiences snowfall in the winter. The precipitation occurs either in the form of snowfall in higher regions and as rainfall in the lower regions. Monsoons prevail from July to September. Rainfall in the Doda district is heavy during July and September. The average annual rainfall is 926 mm and snowfall of about 135 mm.

Demographics

 India census, Doda had a population of 21,605. There were 12,506 males (58%) and 9,099 females (42%). Of the population, 2,726 (12.6%) were age 0-6: 1,487 males (55%) and 1,239 females (45%).  The literacy rate for the people over six was 85.1% (males 92.1%, females 75.2%).

Religion
Islam is the dominant religion in the town with over 66.45% adherents, while Hinduism is followed by 32.62% of the people. Christianity and Sikhism are followed by 0.12% and 0.64% people respectively.

Transport

Road
Doda is well-connected by road to other places in Jammu and Kashmir and India by the NH 244.

Rail
Doda is not connected with railways. The nearest railway station is Udhampur railway station located at a distance of 100 kilometres.

Air
The nearest airport is Jammu Airport located at a distance of 167 kilometres. There are plans to construct an airport in the neighbouring district city of Kishtwar. Upon its completion, the nearest airport at Kishtwar will be around 63 kilometres.

References

Cities and towns in Doda district
Chenab Valley